Rushford is a small village in the English county of Norfolk. The river forms the boundary between Norfolk and Suffolk and, until 1894, Rushford was in both counties. Rushford Hall is south of the river and thus in Suffolk.

The population of the village is included in the civil parish of Brettenham. Filming for the film Witchfinder General starring Vincent Price and Ian Ogilvy took place here in 1967.

The village's name means 'Rush enclosure'.

Notable residents 
Sir John Cheke, tutor to King Edward VI, was granted Rushford, which was a royal manor, by the King.
Edmund Gonville, a founder of Gonville and Caius College, was rector of Rushford from 1326 to 1342.

References 

http://kepn.nottingham.ac.uk/map/place/Suffolk/Rushford

External links 

Rushford Church Website

Villages in Norfolk
Breckland District